Vinyl formate is an organic compound with the formula .  It is the ester formally derived from formic acid and vinyl alcohol.  Although rare commercially, it occurs naturally.  It can be prepared by transvinylation, say by treating vinyl versatate with formic acid in the presence of a mercury(II) catalyst..

References

Monomers
Vinyl esters
Formates